Golden Public School is a higher-secondary co-education private school in the Patiala city of Punjab, India. The school was founded in 1998 and is affiliated to the Central Board of Secondary Education of India.

References 

Co-educational schools in India
High schools and secondary schools in Patiala
Educational institutions established in 1998
1998 establishments in Punjab, India